Leidy Johanna Asprilla Solís (18 April 1997 – 19 May 2019) was a Colombian footballer who played as a forward. She played for the women's team of Orsomarso and also represented Colombia at the under-20 level, earning several caps.

Aspirlla was reported missing on 19 May 2019 while on her way to a training session in Palmira. Her body was found several days later on a nearby highway near her motorcycle. Local police announced that she had died in a traffic accident, rather than a kidnapping or murder as previously assumed.

International career
Aspirlla represented Colombia at several youth tournaments, including the 2014 FIFA U-17 Women's World Cup. At the 2013 South American U-17 Women's Championship, she scored the lone goal against Brazil in a group stage match. She suffered a knee injury in 2016 that kept her out of consideration for the Colombian team, but returned to the under-20 team the following year.

See also
List of kidnappings
List of solved missing person cases

References

1997 births
2019 deaths
Colombian women's footballers
Colombia women's international footballers
Afro-Colombian women
Women's association football forwards
Road incident deaths in Colombia
Missing person cases in Colombia
Motorcycle road incident deaths
Sportspeople from Valle del Cauca Department